The Westgate School may refer to:
 The Westgate School, Winchester, Hampshire, UK
 The Westgate School, Cippenham, Slough, Berkshire, UK

See also
 Westgate (disambiguation)